"A, My Name Is Alex" is a two-part hour-long very special episode of the NBC television series Family Ties. The episodes aired on March 12, 1987, as an hour-long episode, with the second half-hour broadcast without commercials.

The episode won numerous awards, including a Primetime Emmy Award, a Humanitas Prize and a Writers Guild of America Award for writing as well as a DGA Award.

Plot

Part 1 
While the rest of the Keaton family grieves over the sudden death of Alex's childhood friend Greg McCormick, Alex himself is acting strange, gradually being overcome by a volatile mixture of emotions that he futilely tries to hide.  We learn that Greg was killed in a car crash while running an errand that Alex had declined to help him with.

After Greg's funeral, Alex begins showing symptoms of survivor guilt, admitting to Mallory that, "My life was saved out of smallness, out of lack of generosity to a friend"; he then says that he should have been in the car with Greg, and then angrily asks himself "Why am I alive??".  Steven and Elyse attempt to comfort Alex, and help him deal with his emotion by getting him professional help.

Part 2
Alex is talking with an unseen therapist, who helps him to confront the issues he must now deal with resulting from Greg's untimely death.  Through play-acting, Alex revisits his grade school days and situations with his family and attempts to reassess his own life.

When the therapist asks if he believes in God, Alex's analytical side tells him no, but when he expounds on "miraculous things", "phenomena of nature", Alex tells the therapist that he does indeed believe in God, even though he doesn't understand His logic behind allowing Greg to die.  Alex begins to accept Greg's death and realizes that he can keep Greg's memory alive by being more like him.

The staging of the entire second part is similar to the classic American play Our Town.

Cast
Michael J. Fox - Alex Keaton
Michael Gross - Steven Keaton
Meredith Baxter - Elyse Keaton
Justine Bateman - Mallory Keaton
Tina Yothers - Jennifer Keaton
Brian Bonsall - Andy Keaton
Scott Valentine - Nick Moore
Marc Price - Irwin "Skippy" Handelman

Guest cast
Brian McNamara - Greg McCormick
Richard McGonagle - Brother Timothy (part 1 only)
Meg Wyllie - Mrs. Leahy (part 2 only)
David Wohl - The therapist (voice only)

Production
The episode "My Name Is Alex" originally aired on NBC as a special one part episode and was promoted heavily by the network as "Commercial-free".

Reception

Ratings

Critical reception

Awards
The episode won the Primetime Emmy Award for Outstanding Writing for a Comedy Series at the 39th Primetime Emmy Awards, a Humanitas Prize for 60 Minute Network or Syndicated Television at the 13th annual ceremony held in 1987 and a Writers Guild of America Award for Best Screenplay - Episodic Comedy at the 40th annual Writers Guild of America Awards 1987 ceremony held in 1988 for writers Gary David Goldberg & Alan Uger. It also won the Directors Guild of America Award for Outstanding Directing – Comedy Series at the 40th Directors Guild of America Awards for director Will Mackenzie.  It also earned a Primetime Emmy Award for Outstanding Directing for a Comedy Series nomination for Will Mackenzie. In addition it won an Outstanding Technical Direction/Electronic Camerawork/Video Control for a Series Emmy for Parker Roe (technical director), Paul Basta (cameraperson), Tom Dasbach (cameraperson), Richard Price (cameraperson), John Repczynski (cameraperson), and Eric Clay (senior video control).

References 

 avclub
 agonybooth
 televisionheaven 
 tvtimecapsule
 smashingmagazine
 michaeljfoxdatabase
 nytimes

Notes

External links 

 
 

1987 American television episodes
Emmy Award-winning episodes
Television episodes about death